Vizefeldwebel Friedrich Schumacher was a World War I flying ace credited with five aerial victories.

Biography

Schumacher joined Jagdstaffel 10 in March 1918 but was sidelined by illness from 4 April to 6 May, missing a month at the front. On his return he had five confirmed claims (three observation balloons and two French-flown SPADs) before being wounded on 24 July 1918.

End notes

Reference
 Above the Lines: The Aces and Fighter Units of the German Air Service, Naval Air Service and Flanders Marine Corps, 1914–1918. Norman Franks, Frank W. Bailey, Russell Guest. Grub Street, 1993. , .

German World War I flying aces
Recipients of the Iron Cross (1914)